Zinovy Yakovlevich Korogodsky (July 29, 1926, Tomsk, USSR –  May 22, 2004, St. Petersburg, Russia) was a Russian theater director, Professor, People's Artist of the RSFSR, winner of the Stanislavsky Award, an honorary professor of the Yaroslav-the-Wise Novgorod State University.

In 1950 he graduated from the Russian State Institute of Performing Arts. He worked in the theaters of Leningrad, Kaluga, Kaliningrad. In  1962-1986 he was the leader of the Leningrad Young People’s Theatre.

In 1986 he was convicted on false charges of sodomy, but the sentence was canceled and the case closed for lack of evidence. He was head of the laboratory young playwrights Russia.

In 2001, he was appointed a professor at Yaroslav-the-Wise Novgorod State University where he taught until his death in 2004. He received an honorary professor of the University (posthumously).

He was buried in Komarovo, Saint Petersburg.

References

External links
 Санкт-Петербургский Государственный театр юных зрителей имени А. А. Брянцева и музей при театре
 Зиновий Корогодский (1926-2004). Золотое зерно театра

People from Tomsk
Theatre directors from Saint Petersburg
People's Artists of the RSFSR
Academic staff of Yaroslav-the-Wise Novgorod State University
People prosecuted under anti-homosexuality laws
1926 births
2004 deaths
Soviet Jews
Russian Jews